Tai Lam Tunnel (Chinese: 大欖隧道), running along Tsing Long Highway, is part of Route 3 Country Park Section (R3CPS) and is a transport link between the western New Territories in Ting Kau and Yuen Long.

Tai Lam Tunnel was constructed to ease traffic congestion at Tuen Mun Road, Tate's Cairn Tunnel and Castle Peak Road, and to link traffic directly from New Territories West to urban areas of Kowloon West and Hong Kong Island, the Hong Kong International Airport and the Kwai Tsing Container Terminals. Located adjacent to the boundary crossings of Lok Ma Chau and Shenzhen Bay, it connects with Shenzhen and Guangzhou for serving both cross-boundary passenger services and cargo logistics.

Toll area
Tai Lam Tunnel is a  dual 3-lane tunnel.

The tolled area, with two entrances/exits at the south end, Ting Kau Bridge and Tuen Mun Road at Ting Kau, crosses Tai Lam Country Park to its north end at Pat Heung.

Construction and operation
Tai Lam Tunnel is a Build-Operate-Transfer (B.O.T) project with a franchise period of 30 years (including construction period). Its total construction cost was HK$7.25 billion. Construction on Tai Lam Tunnel started on 13 March 1995 and was officially opened to traffic on 25 May 1998 to match with the opening of the new Hong Kong International Airport.

The designed traffic capacity of Tai Lam Tunnel is 140,000 vehicles per day. In 2011/2012, the average daily traffic was over 54,000 vehicles.

According to the statistics from the Transport Department of the Government of Hong Kong, Tai Lam Tunnel has higher-than-average safety records. In 2011, the accident rate per million vehicle-km was just 0.07.

Tunnel tolls

The tunnel is well known for its high tolls similar as the Western Harbour Crossing. Its toll for private cars is HK$48, making it the second most expensive tunnel in Hong Kong; the most expensive is the Western Harbour Crossing at HK$75. For coaches, it is the highest in the city, about 4 times higher than the longer Tate's Cairn Tunnel.

Environmental protection and sustainable measures

The tunnel company performed compensatory tree planting at a rate of three replacement saplings for each tree felled. In total, 250,000 trees, 150,000 shrubs and 60,000 climbing plants were planted during the construction period.

As to conservation of wildlife, there is a small tunnel constructed at the south portal of Tai Lam Tunnel, mainly for small wild animals in this area to commute in the valley freely, allowing them to maintain their habituation.

To keep in pace with technology development, Tai Lam Tunnel has gradually replaced traditional light bulbs with light-emitting diodes (LEDs). The indicator lighting signals inside the tunnel tubes and at the toll plaza as well as the illuminating system in the administration building have thus been replaced for reducing carbon emission.

See also
 Tai Lam Tunnel Bus Interchange

References

External links

 Route 3 (CPS) Company Limited

Extra areas operated by NT taxis
Pat Heung
Road tunnels in Hong Kong
Route 3 (Hong Kong)
Ting Kau
Toll tunnels in Hong Kong
1998 establishments in Hong Kong